The Samwell Baronetcy, of Upton in the County of Northampton, was a title in the Baronetage of England. It was created on 22 December 1675 Thomas Samwell, later Member of Parliament for Northamptonshire and Northampton. He was the great-grandson of Sir William Samwell, Auditor of the Exchequer to Queen Elizabeth I of England. The second Baronet sat as Member of Parliament for Coventry. On the death of the fourth Baronet in 1789, the title became extinct.

Samwell baronets, of Upton (1675)
Sir Thomas Samwell, 1st Baronet (1654–1694)
Sir Thomas Samwell, 2nd Baronet (1687–1757)
Sir Thomas Samwell, 3rd Baronet (1711–1779)
Sir Wenman Samwell, 4th Baronet (1728–1789)

References

Extinct baronetcies in the Baronetage of England
People from Upton, Northamptonshire